Euseius nigeriaensis is a species of mite in the family Phytoseiidae.

References

nigeriaensis
Articles created by Qbugbot
Animals described in 2001